Kim Seung-jun (born 11 September 1994) is a South Korean football player, who plays for Suwon FC.

Honours

International
South Korea U23
 King's Cup: 2015

References

External links 
 
 

1994 births
Living people
Association football forwards
South Korean footballers
Ulsan Hyundai FC players
Gyeongnam FC players
K League 1 players